José de Segovia may refer to:
José Antonio de Segovia, (born 1982), Spanish cyclist
Jose de Segovia (journalist), (born 1964), Spanish journalist, teacher and theologian